Tremont Street is a major thoroughfare in Boston, Massachusetts.

Tremont Street begins at Government Center in Boston's city center as a continuation of Cambridge Street, and forms the eastern edge of Boston Common. Continuing in a roughly southwesterly direction, it passes through Boston's Theater District, crosses the Massachusetts Turnpike, and becomes a broad boulevard in the South End neighborhood. It then turns to the west as a narrower four-lane street, running through Mission Hill and terminating at Brigham Circle, where it intersects Huntington Avenue. The street name zigzags across several physical roads, often requiring a sharp turn to remain on the street, as a result of changes made to the street grid during urban renewal.

Etymology

The name is a variation of one of the original appellations of the city, "Trimountaine", a reference to a hill that formerly had three peaks. Beacon Hill, with its single peak, is all that remains of the Trimountain. Much of the Trimountain was removed, and the earth used as fill to expand the Shawmut Peninsula. The two smaller peaks, Cotton Hill (or Pemberton Hill, at what is now Pemberton Square) and Mt. Whoredom (or Mt. Vernon, formerly at the location of the modern-day Louisburg Square) no longer exist.  The central peak, Sentry Hill, now called Beacon Hill, is smaller than the original peak, which reached approximately to the height of the top of the State House.

A British military map of Boston from 1775, prepared by a Lieut. Sir Thomas Hyde Page of His Majesty's Corps of Engineers, shows Beacon Hill, Mount Whoredom, and another unnamed hill all just above Beacon Street. There is a small street on the northeast corner of Boston Common called "Treamount Street" from School Street to Hanover Street, the precursor of modern Tremont Street, running north from what was then called Common Street (modern Tremont Street alongside the eastern border of Boston Common).

Points of interest

Sites of interest along Tremont Street, from northeast to southwest, include:

Government Center
King's Chapel
Tremont Temple
Granary Burying Ground
Suffolk University Law School
Park Street Church
Boston Common
Emerson College
Masonic Grand Lodge
Boston Theater District
Wang Center for the Performing Arts
Boston Center for the Arts
Our Lady of Perpetual Help Basilica

Transportation

The Tremont Street subway runs underneath the street. Opened in 1897, it was the first subway tunnel in North America and still carries the MBTA Green Line.

The Green Line stops in three places under Tremont Street:

Government Center
Park Street
Boylston

Gallery

See also
 Cathedral Church of St. Paul, Boston

Former tenants:
 Adams & Co. (Boston)
 Beacon Theatre, Boston, 20th century
 Boston Museum (theatre)
 Columbian Museum
 De Vries, Ibarra & Co.
 Gleason's Publishing Hall
 Louis P. Goullaud
 Hans Gram
 Gardiner Greene
 Haymarket Theatre (Boston, Massachusetts)
 Horticultural Hall (1865–1901)
 Hotel Boylston, 19th century
 Keith's Theatre (Boston)
 Mason & Hamlin
 National Theatre, South End
 Odd Fellows Hall, Boston, Tremont and Berkeley Streets
 S.S. Pierce Co.
 Provident Institution for Savings in the Town of Boston
 Studio Building (Boston, Massachusetts), no.110 Tremont
 Tremont House (Boston)
 Tremont Theatre, Boston (1889)
 William Verstille, portraitist
 Washington Gardens (Boston)

References
Notes

Further reading
 
 Views of Tremont Street, Boston. Bulletin of the Boston Public Library, 1894.
 City of Boston, Landmarks Commission. Connolly's Bar Study Report, 1997

External links

 "Tremont Street in the Rain, Boston, Massachusetts, undated". Historic New England. Photographer: Unknown
 https://www.loc.gov/pictures/item/2007661063
 https://www.loc.gov/pictures/item/2007661071
 Flickr. Photo of elevated railroad on Tremont St. at Granary, c. early 20th century.  Includes view of Horticultural Hall. Courtesy of Bostonian Society.

Streets in Boston